Patriarch Paisius of Constantinople may refer to:

 Paisius I of Constantinople, Ecumenical Patriarch of Constantinople in 1652–1653
 Paisius II of Constantinople, Ecumenical Patriarch of Constantinople for four times in the 18th century